A metronome is any device that produces regular, metrical ticks (beats, clicks) — settable in beats per minute.

Metronome may also refer to:

 City of Metronome, an upcoming video game set in the fictional city
 Metronome (artists' and writers' organ), a curatorial and research-led platform founded in 1996 by Clémentine Deliss
 Metronome (band), a Japanese gamewave band
 Metronome (magazine), a music-guide magazine published between 1881 and 1961
 Metronome (public artwork), a public-art installation across from Union Square in New York City
 "Metronome", a song by Jolin Tsai from the 2007 album Agent J
 Metronome Records, a Swedish record label now known as Warner Music Sweden
 Metronome Spartacus, a Swedish television-production company
 Prague Metronome, a sculpture of a giant functional mechanical metronome in Prague

See also
 Metronom Eisenbahngesellschaft, a railway company in Germany